Landmark is the seventh studio album by the Japanese rock band Asian Kung-Fu Generation, released on September 12, 2012.

History
In late 2011, Gotoh confirmed in his diary that the band were in the studio recording new songs. In July 2012, shortly after their 2012 Nano-Mugen Festival, the title and release date of the album were announced, along with a 22-show nationwide tour in support of the album.

On August 2, Gotoh claimed that the album "is a masterpiece" via Twitter.

On August 8, the album art was revealed, credited to Yusuke Nakamura, a long time art collaborator with the band. The track list was also confirmed, revealing that "All Right Part 2" will be the second song to appear on both a Nano-Mugen Compilation and a studio album (the first being "Blackout", which appeared on the first Nano-Mugen Compilation as well as Fanclub.) "N2" was previously released on the "Marching Band" single as a b-side, similar to three tracks on Surf Bungaku Kamakura.

On August 28, the song "Bicycle Race" was first played on "School of Lock", a segment on a radio station in Tokyo. The music video for the song was released on September 7.

Two different limited editions of the album were released, with one including an LP version of the album, and the other including a compilation DVD of songs performed at both, a 2011 Nano-Mugen festival concert, and a 2012 Best Hit AKG concert.

The album became the band's first original album to be made available for purchase in the United States through the iTunes store, being released on October 17.

Track listing
The track list for the album was confirmed by Gotoh on his diary on August 23, 2012.

Disc 1 (CD - Landmark)

Disc 2 (Limited Edition Live DVD)
 All songs are from the "Best Hit AKG" concert held on February 23, 2012, except for track 8 "All right part2", recorded from the Nano-Mugen 2011 circuit.

Personnel
 Masafumi Gotoh - vocals, guitar, programming
 Kensuke Kita - guitar, vocals
 Takahiro Yamada - bass, vocals
 Kiyoshi Ijichi - drums, percussion, synthesizer

References
CDJapan

Asian Kung-Fu Generation albums
2012 albums
Japanese-language albums
Sony Music albums